Grave Intentions is a 2021 American anthology horror film directed by Lukas Hassel, Brian Patrick Lim and Gabriel Olson and starring Joy Vandervort-Cobb, Beth Grant, Sharon Lawrence, Robert Forster (in his final film appearance) and Hassel.

Cast
Joy Vandervort-Cobb as Madam Josephine
Beth Grant as Mattie Whalen
Robert Forster as Don Whalen
Sharon Lawrence as Olivia Korhonen
Kevin Dee as Willie Bingham
Gregory J. Fryer as George Morton
Charly Thorn as Florence
Lucas Oktay as Young Luke
Lukas Hassel as Father
Colleen Carey as Mother
Astarte Abraham as Aunt/Mom

Release
The film was released on digital on October 15, 2021.

Reception
The film has a 67% rating on Rotten Tomatoes based on six reviews.

Bobby LePire of Film Threat gave the film a 9 out of 10 and wrote "As with all anthologies, some portions of Grave Intentions are stronger than others. But each tale at least has one or two stand-out elements that make them worthy of watching."

References

External links
 
 

2020s English-language films